The Drowned Vault is a 2012 fantasy novel written by N.D. Wilson. It is the second installment in the Ashtown Burials series, and a sequel to The Dragon's Tooth.

Kirkus Book Reviews suggested that "though the mythological references still succeed," it feels as though the author is "trying to keep the stakes high and to top what has come before, which can be tedious for readers who are not attached to the outcome."

Notes 

2012 American novels
2012 fantasy novels
American young adult novels
Children's fantasy novels
Novels by N. D. Wilson
Random House books